Macrogastra plicatula is a species of air-breathing land snail, a terrestrial pulmonate gastropod mollusk in the family Clausiliidae, the door snails. 

Subspecies
 Macrogastra plicatula amiatensis H. Nordsieck, 2006
 Macrogastra plicatula apennina (Gentiluomo, 1868)
 Macrogastra plicatula aprutica H. Nordsieck, 2006
 Macrogastra plicatula licana (A. J. Wagner, 1912)
 Macrogastra plicatula plicatula (Draparnaud, 1801)
 Macrogastra plicatula plicosula (M. von Gallenstein, 1852)
 Macrogastra plicatula superflua (Charpentier, 1852)

Description
Like all the species in this family, Macrogastra plicatula has a clausilium. The weight of the adult live snail is 66.0±1.6 mg.

Distribution
Its native distribution is European:

 Czech Republic
 Slovakia
 Ukraine
 and others

Ecology
It inhabits woods.

References

 Rossmässler, E. A. (1835-1837). Iconographie der Land- & Süßwasser- Mollusken, mit vorzüglicher Berücksichtigung der europäischen noch nicht abgebildeten Arten. (1) 1 (1): VI + 1-132. pl. 1-5 
 Bank, R. A.; Neubert, E. (2017). Checklist of the land and freshwater Gastropoda of Europe. Last update: July 16th, 2017
 Sysoev, A. V. & Schileyko, A. A. (2009). Land snails and slugs of Russia and adjacent countries. Sofia/Moskva (Pensoft). 312 pp., 142 plates.

External links
 Draparnaud, J.-P.-R. (1801). Tableau des mollusques terrestres et fluviatiles de la France. Montpellier / Paris (Renaud / Bossange, Masson & Besson). 1-116
 Pfeiffer, L. (1849). Nachträge zu L. Pfeiffer Monographia Heliceorum. Zeitschrift für Malakozoologie. Cassel (Theodor Fischer). 6 (4): 66-79 [30 November 1849; 6 (6): 81-95 ]

Clausiliidae
Gastropods described in 1801